In the 1948–49 season, USM Alger was competing in the First Division for the 12th season French colonial era, as well as in the Forconi Cup.

Competitions

Overview

First Division

League table

Group B

Matches

Forconi Cup

Squad
Sid Ahmed Khos, Azouz, Nait Kaci, Chabri, Ouaguenouni, Zouaoui, Bedareb, Hamdi, Djeknoun, Beddaréne, Zitouni, Ben Adad, Aidoun, Chaouane, Chahi, Hamdouche

References

External links
 L'Echo d'Alger : journal républicain du matin

USM Alger seasons
Algerian football clubs 1948–49 season